Toralf Konetzke (born 10 December 1972) is a German former professional footballer who played as a striker. He spent two seasons in the Bundesliga with FC Energie Cottbus and FC St. Pauli.

Honours
 DFB-Pokal finalist: 1996–97

References

External links
 

1972 births
Living people
Sportspeople from Cottbus
German footballers
Footballers from Brandenburg
Association football forwards
FC Energie Cottbus players
FC Energie Cottbus II players
SC Fortuna Köln players
FC St. Pauli players
SV Wacker Burghausen players
Bundesliga players
2. Bundesliga players
People from Bezirk Cottbus